Times Square Station is a station of Line 1, Suzhou Rail Transit. The station is located in Suzhou Industrial Park of Suzhou. It has been in use since April 28, 2012, the same time of the preoperation of Line 1.

In November 2019, this station and many others were partially renamed to Shidaiguangchang Station. On line maps and official maps, this station's English name is listed as "Shidaiguangchang". However, ticket machines still display the name "Times Square".

Gallery

See also
Harmony Times Square

References

Railway stations in Jiangsu
Suzhou Industrial Park
Suzhou Rail Transit stations
Railway stations in China opened in 2012